Anna Chlebounová (8 December 1875 – 14 March 1946) was a Czechoslovakian politician. In 1920 she was one of the first group of women elected to the Chamber of Deputies, remaining in parliament until 1935.

Biography
Chlebounová was born Anna Burešová in Butschina in 1875. She wanted to train as a teacher, but following her father's death in 1889, the family did not have the financial resources to allow her to study. Her mother sold the family farm  and she was sent to live with her uncle for three years, where she spent evenings reading in his extensive library. He was elected mayor of the village in 1899 and Chlebounová subsequently assisted him in the running of the village, using a stamp of his signature to approve decisions. The couple had seven children, one of whom died as a child. Their son Miroslav took over the farm in 1924.

In 1920 she was a candidate for the party (now renamed the Republican Party of the Czechoslovak Countryside) for the Chamber of Deputies in the parliamentary elections, and was one of sixteen women elected to parliament. She continued to wear a headscarf, which she saw a symbol of rural women. With parliamentarians having the right to first class rail travel, her presence in the first class carriage was regularly challenged by people not realising she was a member of the Chamber of Deputies. She was re-elected to the Chamber of Deputies in 1925 and was then elected to the Senate in 1929, serving until 1935, when she retired for health reasons.

She died in Džbánov in 1946.

References

1875 births
Czechoslovak women in politics
Members of the Chamber of Deputies of Czechoslovakia (1920–1925)
Members of the Chamber of Deputies of Czechoslovakia (1925–1929)
Members of the Senate of Czechoslovakia (1929–1935)
Republican Party of Farmers and Peasants politicians
1946 deaths
Austro-Hungarian politicians